Michael Gary Baird (born May 18, 1951 in South Gate, California) is an American drummer. He has played drums for Airborne, Vasco Rossi, Billy Idol, Hall and Oates, Pointer Sisters, Donna Summer, Riverdogs, Animotion, Richard Marx, Michael Bolton, Rick Springfield, Eddie Money, Kenny Loggins, Yumi Matsutoya, Juice Newton, and Prism.  He was a touring drummer for Journey on their tour for the Raised on Radio album.

Partial discography

With Hall & Oates
 Daryl Hall & John Oates (1975)

With Jamie Owens
 Growing Pains (1975)

With Paul Anka
 Headlines (1979)
 Walk a Fine Line (1983)

With Bob Dylan
 Down in the Groove (1988)

With Rodney Crowell
 Street Language (1986)

With Airborne
 Airborne (1979)

With George Benson
 Twice the Love (1988)

With Juice Newton
 Can't Wait All Night (1984)
 Ain't Gonna Cry (1989)

With Peabo Bryson
 Peace on Earth (1997)

With Natalie Cole
 Everlasting (1987)

With Sheena Easton
 Best Kept Secret (1983)
 My Cherie (1995)

With Airplay
 Airplay (1980) 

With Barbra Streisand
 Back to Broadway (1993)

With Livingston Taylor
 Three Way Mirror (1978)

With Michael Bolton
 The Hunger (1987)

With Nigel Olsson
 Nigel Olsson (1978)
 Nigel (1979)

With Toni Basil
 Word of Mouth (1982)
 Toni Basil (1983)

With Art Garfunkel
 Fate for Breakfast (1979)

With Kenny Loggins
 Back to Avalon (1988)
 Leap of Faith (1991)

With Dionne Warwick
 Friends in Love (1982)

With Al Jarreau
 High Crime (1984)

With Irene Cara
 What a Feelin' (1983)

With Bette Midler
 Bette of Roses (1995)

With Syreeta Wright
 Syreeta (1980)

With Yvonne Elliman
 Night Flight (1978)

With Neil Diamond
 Heartlight (1982)

With America
 Alibi (1980)

With Cherie & Marie Currie
 Messin' with the Boys (1980)
 Messin' with the Boys  (re-released, 1997)
 Young and Wild (1998)

With Donna Summer
 She Works Hard for the Money (1983)
 Cats Without Claws (1984)

With Randy Crawford
 Now We May Begin (1980)

With Rick Springfield
 Success Hasn't Spoiled Me Yet (1982)
 Living in Oz (1983)
 Hard to Hold (Soundtrack) (1984)
 Tao (1985)
 Karma (1999)

With Cher
 Prisoner (1979)

With Van Stephenson
 Righteous Anger (1984)
 Suspicious Heart (1986)

With Céline Dion
 Let's Talk About Love (1997)

With Eddie Money
 Can't Hold Back (1986)
 Nothing to Lose (1988)
 Right Here (1991)

With Riverdogs
 Riverdogs (1988)

With Rita Coolidge
 Anytime...Anywhere (1977)
 Love Me Again (1978)

With Richard Marx
 Repeat Offender (1989)
 Rush Street (1991)

With Billy Idol
 Charmed Life (1990)

With Richie Havens
 The End Of The Beginning (1976)

With Joe Cocker
 Cocker (1986)
 Night Calls (1991)

With Kenny Rogers
 We've Got Tonight (1983)
 They Don't Make Them Like They Used To (1986)

With i-Ten
 Taking a Cold Look (1983)

With Yumi Matsutoya
 The 14th Moon (1976)

With Shogo Hamada
 Home Bound (1980)

With Prism
 Beat Street (1983)

References 

1951 births
Living people
American rock drummers
Journey (band) members
American session musicians
People from South Gate, California
Musicians from California
20th-century American drummers
American male drummers